Robert E. "Judge" Hughes (November 17, 1944 – July 31, 2013) was an American football player and coach.  He was selected by the Philadelphia Eagles in the 1967 NFL/AFL Draft and played in the National Football League (NFL) with the Atlanta Falcons in 1967 and 1969.  Hughes served as the head football coach at his alma mater, Jackson State University, from 1999 to 2002, compiling a record of 30–15.

College career
Hughes played as a defensive lineman for the Jackson State Tigers and was named to the JSU All-Century team in 2011; he is also in the university Hall of Fame.

Professional career
Hughes was drafted by the Philadelphia Eagles in the 1967 NFL/AFL Draft . He played for the Atlanta Falcons in 1967 and 1969.

Coaching career
Hughes was an assistant football coach and recruiting coordinator for the Jackson State Tigers before being named head coach in 1999. He served in that position for four seasons. In his first season, Hughes led Jackson State to a 9–3 record, winning the Southwestern Athletic Conference (SWAC) East Division title and an appearing in the inaugural SWAC Championship Game in Birmingham, Alabama, which the Tigers lost 31–30. In each of the following three seasons, Hughes' Tigers finished with a 7–4 record. Hughes' overall record at Jackson state was 30–15, with a .667 winning percentage.

Personal life and death
Hughes and his wife Joyce had three children. He died in 2013 from complications of diabetes.

Head coaching record

References

External links
 

1944 births
2013 deaths
American football defensive linemen
Atlanta Falcons players
Jackson State Tigers football coaches
Jackson State Tigers football players
Philadelphia Eagles players
People from Columbus, Mississippi
Coaches of American football from Mississippi
Players of American football from Mississippi
African-American coaches of American football
African-American players of American football
20th-century African-American sportspeople
21st-century African-American sportspeople
Deaths from diabetes